Demetrius from the kindred Tétény (died after 1234) was a Hungarian noble in the first half of the 13th century, who served as ispán of Varaždin County in 1234, during the reign of Andrew II of Hungary.

Life
Demetrius was born into the gens (clan) Tétény as the son of Marcellus I (or Ambrose). His four brothers were Marcellus II, Peter I – both of them were influential barons in the court of Andrew II –, Fabian and Abraham.

Demetrius acted as co-judge beside the king in 1232, on the occasion of a lawsuit. He was mentioned among the barons of the kingdom as "friar Marceli". Demetrius served as ispán of Varaždin County in 1234, but it is possible he already held the office in 1232.

References

Sources

 
 
 

13th-century Hungarian people
Demetrius